Nurds is the second studio album by the folk trio the Roches, released on Warner Bros. Records in 1980. It was positively reviewed although not quite as highly as their first album. The Rolling Stone review noted that they were "not just entertaining but downright terrifying". The album peaked at number 130 on the Billboard 200.

Track listing

Credits
 Recordist: Jon Mathias
 Assistant: Dave Alhard
 Maggie Roche: acoustic guitar, vocals
 Suzzy Roche: acoustic guitar, vocals
 Terre Roche: acoustic guitar, electric guitar, vocals
 Jay Dee Daugherty: drums
 Fred Smith: electric bass guitar
 Lincoln Goines: acoustic bass guitar
 Jon Mathias: electric bass guitar on "Nurds"
 Gabriel Katona: synthesizer
 Bob Conti: percussion
 Bobby Gordon: clarinet on "Bobby's Song"
 Basic tracks and vocals recorded at Record Plant, NYC
 Overdubs: Redwing Studios, Tarzana, California
 Finishing touches: United Western Studios, Los Angeles
 Mastering: Greg Calbi

Chart performance

References

1980 albums
The Roches albums
Warner Records albums
Albums produced by Roy Halee
Albums recorded at United Western Recorders